Regular Urban Survivors is the third album by the British rock band Terrorvision. "Perseverance", "Easy", "Bad Actress" and "Celebrity Hit List" were each released as singles. "Perseverance" and "Celebrity Hit List" were both regular Match of the Day 'goal of the week' regulars. The album featured movie-themed artwork, which depicted the band members as part of a James Bond/Mission: Impossible-style elite fighting force.

To mark the 20th anniversary of the album's release, the band performed Regular Urban Survivors in full during their 2016 UK tour.

Production
Regular Urban Survivors was recorded at Parkgate Studios and Eden Studios, with producer Gil Norton; he and Roy Spong acted as engineers, with assistance from Doug Cook (at Parkgate) and Simon Wall (at Eden). Norton and Spong mixed the album at Abbey Road Studios, with assistance from Robbie Kazandjian.

Track listing
All songs by Terrorvision.

"Enteralterego" – 3:21
"Superchronic" – 2:50
"Perseverance" – 3:11
"Easy" – 3:10
"Hide the Dead Girl" – 3:03
"Conspiracy" – 3:15
"Didn't Bleed Red" – 4:10
"Dog Chewed the Handle" – 2:50
"Junior" – 3:29
"Bad Actress" – 4:12
"If I Was You" – 2:02
"Celebrity Hit List" – 3:05
"Mugwump" – 3:39

Personnel
Personnel per booklet.

Terrorvision
 Tony Wright – vocals
 Shutty – drums
 Mark Yates – guitars
 Leigh Marklew – bass

Additional musicians
 Mark Phythian – programmer
 Audrey Riley – string arranger (track 10)
 Enrico Tomasso – horns (tracks 3, 4 and 13), flugelhorn (tracks 1 and 9)
 Jay Craig – horns (tracks 3, 4 and 13)
 Pete Long – horns (tracks 3, 4 and 13)
 Mark Feltham – harmonica (tracks 1 and 7)
 Bruce Woolley – theremin (tracks 7 and 8)
 Sharon Eusebe – backing vocals (track 9)
 Rachel Corkett – backing vocals (track 9)
 Garrington Plodovich – grooves (track 6)

Production
 Gil Norton – producer, mixing
 Roy Spong – engineer, mixing
 Doug Cook – assistant engineer
 Simon Wall – assistant engineer
 Robbie Kazandjian – assistant engineer

Design
 Abrahams Pants – art direction, design
 Terrorvision – art direction, design
 Tweddell – scenic artist
 Martyn James Brooks – photography
 Jeremy Ranson – location manager
 Spymaster – guns, gadgets

References

1996 albums
Terrorvision albums